WABY (900 kHz) is a commercial AM radio station licensed to Watervliet, New York and serving the Capital District. The station broadcasts a classic country radio format and is owned by Loud Media.

By day, WABY is powered at 400 watts.  But because 900 AM is a Mexican clear channel frequency, WABY must reduce power at night to only 70 watts to avoid interference.  It uses a non-directional antenna at all times.  Programming is also heard on FM translator W230DK at 93.9 MHz in Albany.  It uses its FM dial position in its moniker, "K94.1."

History

The station went on the air as WSPN in the 1950s, in Saratoga Springs, later changing call letters to WKAJ, in 1964. For many years the station broadcast an MOR type of format. In 1992, the call letters were changed to WBGG, and the format to Country. In 1994, the station changed its call sign to WCKM, and its format to Oldies. In 1996, the call letters reverted to WKAJ, and the format was changed to Nostalgia. In 1999, WKAJ became WUAM; the antenna was moved to Watervliet in April 2008, splitting from the simulcast with WABY to repeat Capital News 9's television audio. Since April 2011, the station has been relayed on 106.1 FM via translator W291BY, broadcasting from Albany, New York at 250 watts ERP.

Ernie Anastos sold his Albany-area stations—WUAM and its translator, WABY, WQAR, and WVKZ—to Empire Broadcasting Corporation in June 2012 at a purchase price of $1.2 million. The transaction was consummated on September 7, 2012.

On May 27, 2014, WUAM changed its format to adult standards, branded as "Moon Radio". The station became WABY on July 3, 2014; the call sign was previously used by sister station WAIX, and before then on what are now WAMC and WYKV. On March 12, 2018, the adult standards format was dropped when Empire Broadcasting transferred its "The X" adult album alternative format from WAIX to WABY.

On May 15, 2018, WABY and its sister AM stations went silent (off the air). The stations' owner noted that, although the sale of an FM sister station cleared all of the stations' debts, the stations were still operating at a loss and that until a freeze on FM translator awards was lifted, the stations could not be sustained.

The station was acquired by Saratoga Radio LLC on October 1, 2019, and the FCC approved the transaction on December 16, 2019. The station now simulcasts with WSSV and is known as 'Saratoga's Star Radio'

On December 9, 2020, WABY changed their format from classic hits to a simulcast of classic country-formatted WNYV 94.1 FM Whitehall, branded as "K94.1".

Previous logo

References

External links

ABY
Classic country radio stations in the United States
Radio stations established in 1964
1964 establishments in New York (state)